The Houston Marathon is an annual marathon usually held every January in Houston, Texas, United States, since 1972.  With thousands of runners and spectators, it is the largest single day sporting event in the city.  It is run concurrently with a half marathon and a 5 km race. The 2007 race included the first-ever satellite running of the event, run simultaneously in Fallujah, Iraq.

The races bring crowds of nearly one half million to view the runners.

History 

The first marathon, run on December 30, 1972, featured 113 runners and a crowd of approximately 200 people.

The 1979 edition of the competition hosted the national marathon championship race for men and women.  Houston was selected for the women's Olympic Trials in 1992 and held the USATF women's marathon championship in 1998.  The half marathon course hosted the USATF Men's Half Marathon Championship from 2005 to 2008, and also hosted the women's event in 2007 and 2008.  The 2012 U.S. Olympic Marathon Trials for both men and women were held the Saturday prior to the Sunday races.

George W. Bush ran in the Houston Marathon at age 46 in 1993, finishing with the time of 3 hours, 44 minutes, 52 seconds.

The 2014 edition included a 5K event run Saturday, January 18th and the marathon and half marathon run on Sunday, January 19th. The 5K event had close to 5,000 runners while the marathon and half marathon had nearly 13,000 runners each.

The 2021 in-person edition of the race was cancelled due to the coronavirus pandemic, with all registrants given the option of running the race virtually (and receiving a discount for the race in 2022), or transferring their entry to 2022 or 2023.  The virtual marathon was planned for January 2021.

Course

The fast and flat course starts in the downtown area near Minute Maid Park and takes runners past scenic Houston areas and communities—including Houston Heights and Neartown, past Hermann Park and Rice University, over to Uptown, and then through Memorial Park and Allen Parkway, finishing at the George R. Brown Convention Center downtown. The course is USATF certified and is popular with runners seeking to qualify for the Boston Marathon. The race time limit is 6 hours and a limit of 27,000 entries is enforced, divided evenly between the full and half marathons.

The course was changed for 2014. Changes included starting on Congress St. downtown, eliminating a section of the course through the Heights, and adding 2 miles along Kirby Dr.

Community impact 

The event supports many charities, including CanCare, Texas Children's Hospital, and The Leukemia & Lymphoma Society.

Sponsorship 

The current corporate sponsor of the marathon is Chevron Corporation.  Aramco sponsors the half marathon and Chevron and Aramco co-sponsor the 5K run.

Winners 

Key:
  Course record
 † = Time was a record mark for the state of Texas

Multiple Winners
For the men,  and  all won the marathon 3 times.

For the women,  and  all won the marathon 3 times.

 is the only athlete who won both the marathon (2011) and the half-marathon (2013) in Houston.

Marathon

Half marathon

National Records
The current National Records were established during the Houston Marathon:
 Men Marathon
 1995:  2:13:57
 Women Marathon
 1996:  2:35:02
 2007:  3:05:13
 2019:  2:43:24 
 2020:  2:24:50 
 2022:  2:19:12
 Women 30km
 2019:  1:55:48
 2020:  1:42:53 
 Women 25km
 2018:  1:32:53
 2019:  1:37:01
 2020:  1:25:48 
 Men Half-Marathon
 2007:  59:43 
 2019:  1:06:46 
 2020:  59:42 
 2022:  1:01:08 
 2022:  1:01:20 
 2022:  1:02:08 
 Women Half-Marathon
 2014  1:15:24
 2018  1:07:25
 2020  1:06:38
 2022  1:07:15
 2023  1:06:52
 Men 20km
 2019:  1:03:23
 2022:  58:05 
 2022:  58:05 
 2022:  59:01
 Women 20km
 2018  1:03:48
 2020  1:03:13 
 Women 10miles
 2018  50:52
 Men 15km
 2022:  43:21 
 2022:  43:23 
 Men 10km
 2022:  29:04 
 Men 5km
 2022:  14:41 
 2022:  14:50

See also
List of marathon races in North America
National records in the marathon

Notes

References

Lists of winners
Houston Marathon – Open Winners: 1972-2010. Houston Marathon. Retrieved on 2012-01-16.
Houston Half Marathon – Race Winners: 2002-2010. Houston Marathon. Retrieved on 2012-01-16.
Houston Marathon. Association of Road Racing Statisticians. Retrieved on 2012-01-16.

External links
Official website
Houston Marathon-Run The Nation
Flotrack.com Video Coverage of 2007 Houston Marathon and Ryan Hall's Record

Marathons in the United States
Recurring sporting events established in 1972
Marathon